Te Kaha is a small New Zealand community situated in the Bay of Plenty near Ōpōtiki. The full name of Te Kaha is Te-Kahanui-A-Tikirākau. Te Kaha is a little outpost that contains a couple of dairies and the Te Kaha resort.

Marae

The township is in the rohe (tribal area) of Te Whānau-ā-Apanui. It has four marae, affiliated with local hapū:

 Te Kaha Marae and Tūkākī meeting house, is affiliated with Te Whānau a Te Ēhutu.
 Maungaroa Marae and Kaiaio meeting house, is affiliated with Te Whānau a Kaiaio.
 Pāhāōa Marae and Kahurautao meeting house, is affiliated with Te Whānau a Kahurautao.
 Waiōrore Marae and Toihau meeting house, is affiliated with Te Whānau a Toihau / Hinetekahu.

In October 2020, the Government committed $497,610 from the Provincial Growth Fund to upgrade the Pāhāōa Marae, creating 14 jobs. It also committed $1,646,820 upgrade a cluster of 6 marae, including Maungaroa Marae, creating 10 jobs.

Demographics
It is part of the wider Cape Runaway statistical area.

Te Kaha had a population of 327 at the 2018 New Zealand census, a decrease of 60 people (−15.5%) since the 2013 census, and an increase of 24 people (7.9%) since the 2006 census. There were 129 households, comprising 147 males and 177 females, giving a sex ratio of 0.83 males per female, with 72 people (22.0%) aged under 15 years, 54 (16.5%) aged 15 to 29, 135 (41.3%) aged 30 to 64, and 63 (19.3%) aged 65 or older.

Ethnicities were 30.3% European/Pākehā, 86.2% Māori, 1.8% Pacific peoples, and 0.9% Asian. People may identify with more than one ethnicity.

Although some people chose not to answer the census's question about religious affiliation, 33.0% had no religion, 42.2% were Christian, and 22.9% had Māori religious beliefs.

Of those at least 15 years old, 21 (8.2%) people had a bachelor's or higher degree, and 66 (25.9%) people had no formal qualifications. 15 people (5.9%) earned over $70,000 compared to 17.2% nationally. The employment status of those at least 15 was that 117 (45.9%) people were employed full-time, 36 (14.1%) were part-time, and 18 (7.1%) were unemployed.

Education

Te Kura o Te Whanau-a-Apanui is a coeducational composite (years 1–13) school with a roll of  students as of  The school opened in 2016 to replace three East Cape schools, and is presently in Ōmaio while premises are being built in Te Kaha.

Notable people
 Corporal Willie Apiata, recipient of the New Zealand Victoria Cross, awarded on 2 July 2007
 Moana-Nui-a-Kiwa Ngarimu, recipient of the VC, awarded posthumously in October 1943
 Taika Waititi, Filmmaker, actor, comedian

References

Ōpōtiki District
Populated places in the Bay of Plenty Region